Bernice Swee Lian Pfitzner (born Eu Swee Lian; 2 May 1938) is a former Australian politician and member of the South Australian Legislative Council.

Born in Singapore, Pfitzner, a doctor, was appointed to the Legislative Council as a member of the Liberal Party in 1990. She was defeated in 1997, but ran as an independent candidate for the Senate in the 1998 federal election.

Her mother Phyllis Eu Cheng Li was the first woman elected to the Singapore City Council.

References

1938 births
Living people
Liberal Party of Australia members of the Parliament of South Australia
Members of the South Australian Legislative Council
Women members of the South Australian Legislative Council
Singaporean emigrants to Australia